Saleh Al Abbas (born April 15, 1995) is a Saudi Arabian  professional footballer who currently plays for Al-Khaleej on loan from Al-Faisaly as a striker.

Career
On 5 August 2017, Saleh Al Abbas joined Najran. In his first season at the club, Al Abbas scored 18 goals in 28 appearances and finished three goals behind the top scorer, Mashari Al-Enezi. He also scored the second goal in the 2–1 defeat of Al-Muzahimiyyah in the relegation play-offs. In his second season, Al Abbas scored 17 goals in 35 appearances as Najran finished in 7th place. He made 68 appearances and scored 36 goals for Najran in his two seasons at the club.

On 24 May 2019, Saleh Al Abbas signed a three-year contract with Pro League champions Al-Nassr. He made his debut on 26 August 2019 in the first leg of the AFC Champions League quarter-finals against Qatari champions Al-Sadd. On 23 August 2019, Al Abbas joined newly promoted Pro League side Abha on a season-long loan. On 7 October 2020, Al Abbas joined newly promoted Pro League side Al-Batin on a season-long loan.

On 31 August 2021, Al Abbas joined Al-Faisaly on a three-year contract. On 25 July 2022, Al Abbas joined newly promoted Pro League side Al-Khaleej on loan.

Career statistics

External links

 Saleh Al Abbas at Kooora

References

1993 births
Living people
Association football forwards
Saudi Arabian footballers
People from Najran
Najran SC players
Al Nassr FC players
Abha Club players
Al Batin FC players
Al-Faisaly FC players
Khaleej FC players
Saudi First Division League players
Saudi Professional League players